Today! is the third studio album by Delta blues musician Skip James, released in 1966 by Vanguard Records.

Reception

AllMusic critic Ron Wynn wrote that "wonderful vocals, superb guitar and a couple of tunes with tasty piano make this essential."

Track listing

Personnel
Skip James – vocals, guitar, piano
Russ Savakus – bass (on "How Long")

References

1966 albums
Skip James albums
Vanguard Records albums